Anis Chedly (born 19 February 1981) is a Tunisian judoka who competed in the super heavyweight division (+100 kg) and open class. He is also a six-time African, and two-time World Cup champion in the same category, and won the gold medal at the 2007 All-Africa Games in Algiers, Algeria. At the 2008 Summer Olympics, Chedly was eliminated in the first preliminary round of the men's +100 kg, after being defeated by France's Teddy Riner, who eventually won the bronze medal. He was also the nation's flag bearer at the opening ceremony.

Career achievements

References

External links
 
 
 

 NBC Olympic Profile

1981 births
Living people
Tunisian male judoka
Olympic judoka of Tunisia
Judoka at the 2008 Summer Olympics
Mediterranean Games silver medalists for Tunisia
Competitors at the 2009 Mediterranean Games
African Games gold medalists for Tunisia
African Games medalists in judo
Mediterranean Games medalists in judo
Competitors at the 2007 All-Africa Games
21st-century Tunisian people
20th-century Tunisian people